Copelatus johannis is a species of diving beetle. It is part of the genus Copelatus in the subfamily Copelatinae of the family Dytiscidae. It was described by Félix Guignot in 1954.

References

johannis
Beetles described in 1954